Pi Rixiu (ca. 834 – 883) was a Tang dynasty poet. His courtesy names were Yishao and Ximei, and he wrote under the pen name Lumenzi. Pi was a contemporary of poet Lu Guimeng; these two poets are often referred to as Pi-Lu.

Pi was born at Xiangyang, in modern Hubei Province. He is thought to have been of humble birth. He spent his youth traveling and writing: his verse was well known by the time he sat for the civil service exam  in 867, when he obtained a degree of Jinshi. After traveling to Suzhou in 868, he became Suzhou magistrate in 869. Later, he participated in the defeat of the Huang Chao's rebellion, and subsequently retired in southern China.

References

 Qian, Zhonglian, "Pi Rixiu". Encyclopedia of China (Chinese Literature Edition), 1st ed.

External links 
 Complete Works of Pi Rixiu
Books of the Quan Tangshi that include collected poems of Pi Rixiu at the Chinese Text Project:
Book 608, Book 609, Book 610,
Book 611, Book 612, Book 613,
Book 614, Book 615, Book 616
 Pʻi Jih-hsiu (William H. Nienhauser, Jr., 1979)

9th-century writers
Tang dynasty poets
830s births
883 deaths
Qi (Huang Chao)
People from Xiangyang
Poets from Hubei
9th-century Chinese poets